Laurie Jill "Lar" Park Lincoln (née Park; born May 12, 1961) is an American actress. She appeared in the 1987 film House II: The Second Story as Kate, the 1988 horror film Friday the 13th Part VII: The New Blood as Tina Shepard, and a 1988 episode of the anthology horror series Freddy's Nightmares as Karyn. Lincoln starred in the television series Knots Landing from 1987 to 1991.

Life and career 
Park was born in Dallas, Texas. She made her acting debut appearing in the 1985 made-for-television movie Children of the Night and in 1987 played the leading role in the independent comedy film, The Princess Academy. Also in 1987, she appeared in the comedy horror House II: The Second Story and following year starred as Tina Shepard in the slasher film, Friday the 13th Part VII: The New Blood, the seventh installment in the Friday the 13th franchise. She also guest-starred on television series including Hunter, Outlaws, Highway to Heaven, Freddy's Nightmares, and Tour of Duty.

In 1987, Park was cast as Linda Fairgate, the daughter-in-law to Karen Fairgate (played by series star Michele Lee) in the CBS prime time soap opera, Knots Landing. She first appeared in the two episodes of show's ninth season, before returning with bigger role as of season eleven to thirteenth. In 1988, Park also played "Sally’s Friend" in the eight episodes of season 10 of Knots Landing. After leaving the series in 1991, she guest-starred on Murder, She Wrote, Space: Above and Beyond and Beverly Hills, 90210.

Park returned to acting in mid-2000s appearing in the Lifetime movie Inspector Mom: Kidnapped in Ten Easy Steps and low-budget productions. Her notable credits include comedy horror film Sky Sharks (2020), meta-slasher film 13 Fanboy (2021) where she plays a fictionalised version of herself being stalked and hunted by an obsessed Friday the 13th fan, and Rose Blood: A Friday the 13th Fan Film (2021), the unofficial fan film continuing the story of Tina Shepard, Her character from Friday the 13th Part VII: The New Blood.

Personal life
Lincoln was married to Michael Martin Lincoln on December 5, 1981, and remained married until his death on December 4, 1995. She has two children and lives near Dallas, Texas. She has been battling breast cancer since 2008, and by 2012 had gone through numerous surgeries.

Filmography

Film

Television

References

External links

Lar Park Lincoln website

1961 births
American film actresses
American television actresses
Film producers from Texas
Living people
Actresses from Dallas
American women film producers
21st-century American women